Thai Post is a daily Thai-language newspaper in Thailand. It is owned by the Thai Journal Group Co. Its circulation is in the 100,000-150,000 range. Currently the HQ is in Klong Toei, Bangkok.

Political Stance 
Thai Post has a biased political reporting in favor of Thai conservatism and nationalism. The newspaper often publishes news with oversensational and misleading headlines, and often using disinformation tactics to attack government opposition and critics. 

On 16 July 2003, the newspaper published comments from media rights advocate Supinya Klangnarong, who said that the Shin Corporation, then majority-owned by the family of Thai Prime Minister Thaksin Shinawatra, had benefited because of favorable policies by the Thaksin government. The newspaper was named as a co-defendant, along with Supinya, in a criminal libel lawsuit brought by Shin Corp. A civil suit sought 400 million baht in compensation. After the Thaksin family sold its shares in Shin Corp to Singapore's Temasek Holdings, the company offered to drop the lawsuit on the condition that Supinya apologized for her comments. Supinya refused the offer. On 14 March 2006, the Criminal Court threw out the criminal lawsuit, saying the article in the Thai Post was presented in good faith and in the public's best interest. On 8 May 2006, Shin Corp. asked that the civil lawsuit be withdrawn. Neither Supinya nor Thai Post had any objections, so the court withdrew the civil suit.

See also 
 Media of Thailand

References

External links 
 ThaiPost.net

1996 establishments in Thailand
Mass media in Bangkok
Newspapers published in Thailand
Publications established in 1996
Thai news websites
Thai-language newspapers